The Grelling–Nelson paradox is an antinomy, or a semantic self-referential paradox, concerning the applicability to itself of the word "heterological", meaning "inapplicable to itself". It was formulated in 1908 by Kurt Grelling and Leonard Nelson, and is sometimes mistakenly attributed to the German philosopher and mathematician Hermann Weyl.
It is thus occasionally called Weyl's paradox and Grelling's paradox. It is closely related to several other well-known paradoxes, in particular, the barber paradox and Russell's paradox.

The paradox

Suppose one interprets the adjectives "autological" and "heterological" as follows:
 An adjective is autological (sometimes homological) if it describes itself. For example, the English word "English" is autological, as are "unhyphenated" and "pentasyllabic".
 An adjective is heterological if it does not describe itself. Hence "long" is a heterological word (because it is not a long word), as are "hyphenated" (because it has no hyphen) and "monosyllabic" (because it has more than one syllable).

All adjectives, it would seem, must be either autological or heterological, for each adjective either describes itself, or it does not. Problems arise in a number of instances, however.

Paradoxical cases
The Grelling–Nelson paradox arises when we consider the adjective "heterological". One can ask: Is "heterological" a heterological word?
If the answer is "no", then "heterological" is autological. This leads to a contradiction, for in this case "heterological" does not describe itself: it must be a heterological word.
But if the answer is "yes", then "heterological" is heterological.  This again leads to a contradiction, because if the word "heterological" describes itself, it is autological.

 Is "heterological" a heterological word?
 no → "heterological" is autological → "heterological" describes itself → "heterological" is heterological, contradiction
 yes → "heterological" is heterological → "heterological" does not describe itself → "heterological" is not heterological, contradiction

The paradox can be eliminated, without changing the meaning of "heterological" where it was previously well-defined, by modifying the definition of "heterological" slightly to hold all nonautological words except "heterological".  But "nonautological" is subject to the same paradox, for which this evasion is not applicable because the rules of English uniquely determine its meaning from that of "autological".  A similar slight modification to the definition of "autological" (such as declaring it false of "nonautological" and its synonyms) might seem to correct that, but the paradox still remains for synonyms of "autological" and "heterological" such as "selfdescriptive" and "nonselfdescriptive", whose meanings also would need adjusting, and the consequences of those adjustments would then need to be pursued, and so on.  Freeing English of the Grelling–Nelson paradox entails considerably more modification to the language than mere refinements of the definitions of "autological" and "heterological", which need not even be in the language for the paradox to arise.  The scope of these obstacles for English is comparable to that of Russell's paradox for mathematics founded on sets.

Arbitrary cases 
One may also ask whether "autological" is autological.
It can be chosen consistently to be either:
 if we say that "autological" is autological and then ask whether it applies to itself, then yes, it does, and thus is autological;
 if we say that "autological" is not autological and then ask whether it applies to itself, then no, it does not, and thus is not autological.

This is the opposite of the situation for heterological: while "heterological" logically cannot be autological or heterological, "autological" can be either. (It cannot be both, as the category of autological and heterological cannot overlap.)

In logical terms, the situation for "autological" is:

while the situation for "heterological" is:

Ambiguous cases
One may also ask whether "loud" is autological or heterological. If said loudly, "loud" is autological; otherwise, it is heterological.  This shows that some adjectives cannot be unambiguously classified as autological or heterological. Newhard sought to eliminate this problem by taking Grelling's Paradox to deal specifically with word types as opposed to word tokens.

Similarities with Russell's paradox
The Grelling–Nelson paradox can be translated into Bertrand Russell's famous paradox in the following way. First, one must identify each adjective with the set of objects to which that adjective applies. So, for example, the adjective "red" is equated with the set of all red objects.  In this way, the adjective "pronounceable" is equated with the set of all pronounceable things, one of which is the word "pronounceable" itself.  Thus, an autological word is understood as a set, one of whose elements is the set itself. The question of whether the word "heterological" is heterological becomes the question of whether the set of all sets which do not contain themselves contains itself.

See also
 List of paradoxes
 Metamagical Themas
 Use–mention distinction
 Liar paradox

Notes

References
 Also in:

External links
Autological words

Self-referential paradoxes
1908 introductions